The 15529 / 15530 Saharsa–Anand Vihar Terminal Jan Sadharan Express is an Express train belonging to Indian Railways East Central Railway zone that runs between  and  in India.

It operates as train number 15529 from Saharsa Junction to Anand Vihar Terminal and as train number 15530 in the reverse direction, serving the states of Bihar, Uttar Pradesh, & Delhi.

Coaches
The 15529 / 30 Saharsa Junction–Anand Vihar Terminal Jan Sadharan Express has 16 general unreserved & two SLR (seating with luggage rake) coaches . It does not carry a pantry car.

As is customary with most train services in India, coach composition may be amended at the discretion of Indian Railways depending on demand.

Service

Routing

Traction
As the route is now fully electrified, a Ghaziabad-based WAP-7 locomotive pulls the train to its destination.

References

External links
15529 Jan Sadharan Express at India Rail Info
15530 Jan Sadharan Express at India Rail Info

Transport in Delhi
Rail transport in Delhi
Rail transport in Uttar Pradesh
Rail transport in Bihar
Transport in Saharsa
Jan Sadharan Express trains